The earliest Cemetery in Porter County is the Bailly Cemetery, 1827.  The largest in the county include: Chesterton and Graceland Cemeteries.  The newest cemetery in the county is Angel Crest Cemetery, just off S.R. 49, north of Valparaiso.

References

Cemeteries in Indiana
Protected areas of Porter County, Indiana
Porter County, Indiana